Ben Gluck is an American animator, screenwriter, and film director. Gluck was a director and head of story at Disney Animation studios

Beginnings
Benjamin Gluck was born in Missouri. He received his Bachelor of Fine Arts degree in Character Animation from the esteemed California Institute of the Arts (CalArts) and was awarded a full-tuition merit scholarship from Walt Disney Feature Animation studios. His student short film Man's Best Friend was awarded the Walter Lantz First Prize Award. That film premiered worldwide in heavy rotation on MTV's network, and received many top awards in the United States  and International film circuits and toured worldwide and theatrically in Spike and Mike's Sick and Twisted Animation Festival.

Career
Gluck started his professional career at DreamWorks Animation as the studio's very first story trainee, on The Prince of Egypt.

After graduating with a BFA in character animation, he was recruited by Walt Disney Feature Animation where he worked for over a decade as a story artist on the Disney films Dinosaur, The Emperor's New Groove, and Home on the Range. He was the first head of story at Disney-Television on the film Bambi 2, and he directed Brother Bear 2, Disney's second sequel to have a higher rating on Rotten Tomatoes than its predecessor.

After Disney, Gluck was recruited by Academy Award nominated director Shane Acker, for head of story, on the Tim Burton produced adult animated, 9  for Focus Features. In this role, Gluck shaped  the characters and supervised the story animatic. Gluck was a segment storyboard artist on the critically acclaimed animated feature film adaptation of Kahlil Gibran's, The Prophet. Gluck was also hired by George Lucas as a creative consultant on the film Strange Magic.

Gluck co-directed, along with Anthony Bell the small budget film Alpha and Omega, which was followed by eight sequels creating the franchise of the same name, and Lionsgate studios highest-grossing original CGI franchise to date.

Gluck was the head of story on two Peanuts specials: Snoopy Presents: For Auld Lang Syne, the first new Peanuts holiday special since 2011, and the 47th overall, and on the 49th original Peanuts streaming holiday special Snoopy Presents: To Mom (and Dad), With Love. Both specials are in collaboration with Apple TV +, and the family of Charles Schultz.

Awards and recognition
 Walter Lantz Honorary Student Academy Award: best short animated film "Man's Best Friend."
 Annie Award for Best Home Entertainment Production: Bambi 2 at the 34th Annie Awards.
 Annie Award for Best Screenplay: Brother Bear 2 at the 35th Annie Awards.

Filmography

Television
   Man's Best Friend (TV) (1996)
 Rugrats (TV) (2000)
 Clerks (TV) (2001)
 Madea's Tough Love (2015)

See also
 Modern animation in the United States
 Walt Disney Animation Studios
 Brad Bird
 Brenda Chapman

References

5.Apple TV+ New Peanuts Holiday Specials

External links
 
 Ben Gluck's Interview with TV Guide

Living people
1979 births
People from Missouri
American animated film directors
Animators from Missouri
Film directors from Missouri